Kayabağı is a village in the Batman District of Batman Province in Turkey. The village is populated by Kurds of the Reşkotan and Sinikan tribes and had a population of 375 in 2021.

The hamlets of Badaraş and Kırmataş are attached to the village.

References 

Villages in Batman District
Kurdish settlements in Batman Province